Samir Mazloum (born 10 September 1934 in Kaakour, Lebanon) is an Emeritus Curial bishop of the Maronite Catholic Patriarchate of Antioch.

Life

Samir Mazloum received on 7 June 1964 his priestly ordination. Pope John Paul II appointed him on 11 November 1996 auxiliary bishop of Antioch and titular bishop of Callinicum dei Maroniti.

Maronite Patriarch of Antioch, Cardinal Nasrallah Boutros Sfeir, ordained him on 11 January 1997 to the episcopate. His co-consecrators were Francis Mansour Zayek, Archbishop ad personam of Saint Maron in Brooklyn and Joseph Mohsen Béchara, Archbishop of Antelias.

In 2000 Mazloum was appointed Curial Bishop of Antioch. On June 6, 2011 Pope Benedict XVI accepted his age-related resignation.

References

External links

1934 births
Lebanese clergy
Living people
21st-century Maronite Catholic bishops
People from Matn District
20th-century Maronite Catholic bishops